The Embassy of Jordan in London is the diplomatic mission of Jordan in the United Kingdom.

References

External links
Official site

Jordan
Diplomatic missions of Jordan
Jordan–United Kingdom relations
Buildings and structures in the Royal Borough of Kensington and Chelsea
Holland Park